The Expendables may refer to:

Arts, entertainment, and media

Films
 The Expendables (1962 film), a made-for-TV film starring Mike Connors
 The Expendables (1989 film), by Cirio H. Santiago
 The Expendables (2000 film), a made-for-TV film starring Brett Cullen
 The Expendables (franchise), an American ensemble action film series co-written and developed by Sylvester Stallone
 The Expendables (2010 film), the first film in the series
 The Expendables 2, the sequel to the 2010 film
 The Expendables 3, the sequel to the 2012 film
 The Expendables 4, the sequel to the 2014 film

Comics
The Expendables Go to Hell, a comic/graphic novel based on the film franchise

Music
 The Expendables (American band)
 The Expendables (New Zealand band)

See also
 Expendable (disambiguation)
 Expendables (role-playing game), a tabletop role-playing game